Iván Martínez Airport  is an airstrip serving the settlement of Estancia,  east-northeast of Punta Arenas in the Magallanes y Antártica Chilena Region of Chile.

See also

Transport in Chile
List of airports in Chile

References

External links
OpenStreetMap - Iván Martínez Airport
Iván Martínez Airport HERE Maps
OurAirports - Iván Martínez Airport
FallingRain - Iván Martínez Airport

Airports in Tierra del Fuego Province, Chile